Battlement National Forest was established by the U.S. Forest Service in Colorado on July 1, 1908 from part of the Battlement Mesa Forest Reserve with .  March 11, 1924 it was renamed Grand Mesa National Forest, and the original name was discontinued.

References

External links
Forest History Society
Listing of the National Forests of the United States and Their Dates (from the Forest History Society website) Text from Davis, Richard C., ed. Encyclopedia of American Forest and Conservation History. New York: Macmillan Publishing Company for the Forest History Society, 1983. Vol. II, pp. 743-788.

Former National Forests of Colorado